Charles Allen Richard (May 30, 1941 – December 13, 1994) was an American football player and coach.  He served as the head football coach at Baker University from 1980 to 1990 and again from 1992 to 1994, compiling a record of 123–28–1.  Richard was inducted into the College Football Hall of Fame as a coach in 2004 and the Kansas Sports Hall of Fame in 2006.

While at Baker, he coached future Green Bay Packers head coach Mike McCarthy.

Head coaching record

College

References

External links
 
 

1941 births
1994 deaths
American football quarterbacks
Baker Wildcats football coaches
Central Missouri Mules football coaches
Coffeyville Red Ravens football coaches
Illinois State Redbirds football coaches
William Jewell Cardinals football players
High school football coaches in Missouri
College Football Hall of Fame inductees
University of Central Missouri alumni
People from Jackson County, Missouri
Sportspeople from Kansas City, Missouri
Players of American football from Kansas City, Missouri